God's Money is the third studio album by American experimental music band Gang Gang Dance, released in 2005 on The Social Registry. It received positive reviews from critics.

Track listing

"God's Money I (Percussion)" – 1:58
"Glory in Itself/Egyptian" – 5:28
"Egowar" – 8:50
"Untitled (Piano)" – 3:19
"God's Money V" – 3:39
"Before My Voice Fails" – 5:21
"God's Money VII" – 3:16
"Nomad for Love (Cannibal)" – 4:50
"God's Money IX" – 2:19

References

2005 albums
Gang Gang Dance albums
The Social Registry albums
Worldbeat albums
Sound collage albums